Generalissimus of the Soviet Union was a military rank proposed for Joseph Stalin following World War II. It was styled after a similar Imperial Russian Army rank held by Aleksei Shein, Prince Alexander Danilovich Menshikov, (reportedly) Duke Anthony Ulrich of Brunswick, and Count Alexander Suvorov. However, Stalin eventually rejected the rank, deeming it too ostentatious. It would have been the highest military rank in the Soviet Union.

Overview
The rank was first proposed on 26 June 1945. According to Stalin biographer Robert Service, Stalin regretted allowing himself the ostentatious military title and asked Winston Churchill to continue to refer to him as a marshal instead. Stalin rejected any kind of distinctions between his military rank and the other Soviet marshals and kept using the original Marshal of the Soviet Union insignia and uniform.

The possibility of the Generalissimus of the Soviet Union rank was mentioned again in 1947 when a draft of a decree about Soviet military ranks was presented to Stalin. General Andrey Khrulyov, director of the General Department of Logistics, was tasked with designing a Soviet Generalissimus uniform for Stalin to use in the victory parade on May 9, 1947. The uniform was finished and presented to Stalin one week before the parade. After examining it, Stalin again expressed dissatisfaction. He declared: "I will never sign this decree. The Soviet Red Army only has Marshal as its highest rank." The subject of new rank was not raised again. Fabricated samples were rejected by Stalin, who considered them to be too luxurious and old-fashioned. Currently they are stored in the Museum of the Great Patriotic War located in Moscow at Poklonnaya Gora.

Stalin taking this rank might have invited a comparison between him and Spanish dictator Francisco Franco, who did hold the rank of Generalissimo and was widely known as such.

Another attempt at creating the rank of a Generalissimus of the Soviet Union was undertaken to honour Leonid Brezhnev's 75th birthday in 1981, but subsequently shelved.

Proposed shoulder insignia
Below are proposed designs of the shoulder insignia of Generalissimus of the Soviet Union.

See also
 Generalissimo
 Military ranks of the Soviet Union
 Marshal of the Soviet Union
 Grand Marshal of the People's Republic of China
 List of Russian field marshals

References

Bibliography

External links
 Generalissimus of the Soviet Union 

Military ranks of the Soviet Union
Titles held only by one person